The World Classical Tamil Conference 2010 was an international gathering of scholars, poets, political leaders and celebrities with an interest in Tamil people, the Tamil language and Tamil literature. It was held in Coimbatore between 23 June and 27 June 2010 with an expenditure of more than 500 Crores.

Venue 
The WCTC was held at CODISSIA Trade Fair Complex in Coimbatore and chaired by then chief minister of Tamil Nadu, M. Karunanidhi and was organized by his government.

Participants 
The conference was inaugurated by the President of India, Pratibha Patil. Finnish Tamil scholar Asko Parpola was awarded the Kalaignar M. Karunanidhi Classical Tamil award. Tamil scholar V. Sivathambi from Sri Lanka, UNESCO Director Arumugam Parasuraman, MP and political leader Sitaram Yechury of Communist Party of India (Marxist), D. Raja of Communist Party of India, Viduthalai Chiruthaigal Katchi President Thol. Thirumavalavan and Pattali Makkal Katchi founder S. Ramadoss participated in the conference. Dignitaries and Tamil scholars were gifted with an engraved Thanjavur plate.

Events 
US Tamil scholar George Hart presented a paper on Sangam literature and Indian epigraphist Iravatham Mahadevan chaired a debate on scripts. Rononjoy Adhikari and Kavitha Gingal from the Institute of Mathematical Science, who were working on a mathematical model to relate the Indus script with the Dravidian language were involved in the debate.

Theme Song

The theme song, "Semmozhiyaana Thamizh Mozhiyaam" was written by then Tamil Nadu Chief Minister M. Karunanidhi with music by A.R. Rahman. The video was directed by Gautham Vasudev Menon featuring artists, musicians, singers.

Controversies
This conference was not approved by the International Association for Tamil Research. Not all agreed with the academic and intellectual rigor of the event.

The conference and associated activities faced opposition and criticisms from various political parties.

See also
World Tamil Conference
Tamil diaspora

References

External links
World Tamil Conference 2010
ulaka thamizh chemmozhi - Tamil
World Classical Tamil Conference – a perspective
The Indus script and the wild ass
World Tamil conference 2010 (உலகத் தமிழ்ச் செம்மொழி மாநாடு)

2010 in India
Tamil diaspora
International conferences